Will Mastin (June 20, 1878 – March 14, 1979), also credited as Will Maston, was a dancer and singer.

Career on the dance floor

Mastin was the leader of the Will Mastin Trio, which included Sammy Davis Sr. and his son Sammy Davis Jr. Will Mastin was also the "uncle" of Sammy Davis Jr. Sammy's father Sammy Davis Sr. and Will were good friends.

The Will Mastin Trio original members were Sammy Davis Sr., Howard M. Colbert Jr., and Will Mastin, although Sammy Davis Jr. would join them on stage when he was a little boy (starting at age 3). Sammy performed "unbilled" in 1929 at the Veterans Memorial in Columbus, Ohio.

Sammy also knew how to act, sing and play many instruments.

Howard M. Colbert Jr. was the tap-dance teacher of Sammy Davis Jr., who treated him much as an uncle. Colbert left the Trio in December 1941 to join the United States Army when the United States declared war on Germany during World War II. Sammy Davis Jr. was 16 years old at this time and became part of the main vaudeville act, replacing Colbert.  The three appeared in the 1947 musical short film Sweet and Low and the 1956 Broadway musical Mr. Wonderful.

Personal life
Mastin was born in Madison, Alabama on June 20, 1878 to a single mother named Sally Mastin, according to the 1880 Federal Census of Enumeration and the California Death Index.

Death
Will Mastin died on March 14, 1979, at age 100, according to the California Death Index. He is interred at Forest Lawn Memorial Park in Glendale, California, near Sammy Davis Sr. and Sammy Davis Jr. The epitaph on his tomb says only: He Was A Vaudevillian, it does not provide birth and death dates.

References

External links
Will Mastin's tomb
Will Mastin Trio c. 1935 (left to right) Sammy Davis Sr., Sammy Davis Jr., and Will Mastin 
Photograph of the Will Mastin Trio Sammy Davis Sr., Sammy Davis Jr., and Will Mastin

RESOURCES
 2003, In Black and White: The Life of Sammy Davis Jr., Billboard Books. ;

1878 births
1979 deaths
Vaudeville performers
American centenarians
Men centenarians
Burials at Forest Lawn Memorial Park (Glendale)